Cosipara is a genus of moths of the family Crambidae.

Species
Cosipara chiricahuae Munroe, 1972
Cosipara cyclophora (Dyar, 1918)
Cosipara delphusa (Druce, 1896)
Cosipara flexuosa (Dyar, 1918)
Cosipara modulalis Munroe, 1972
Cosipara molliculella (Dyar, 1929)
Cosipara smithi (Druce, 1896)
Cosipara stereostigma (Dyar, 1918)
Cosipara tricolor (Zeller, 1872)
Cosipara tricoloralis (Dyar, 1904)

References

Scopariinae
Crambidae genera
Taxa named by Eugene G. Munroe